A vertically scrolling video game or vertical scroller is a video game in which the player views the field of play principally from a top-down perspective, while the background scrolls from the top of the screen to the bottom (or, less often, from the bottom to the top) to create the illusion that the player character is moving in the game world.

Continuous vertical scrolling is designed to suggest the appearance of constant forward motion, such as driving. The game sets a pace for play, and the player must react quickly to the changing environment.

History
In the 1970s, most vertically scrolling games involved driving. The first vertically scrolling video game was Taito's Speed Race, released in November 1974. Atari's Hi-way was released eleven months later in 1975. Rapidly there were driving games that combined vertical, horizontal, and even diagonal scrolling, making the vertical-only distinction less important. Both Atari's Super Bug (1977) and Fire Truck (1978) feature driving with multidirectional scrolling. Sega's Monaco GP (1979) is a vertical-only scrolling racing game, but in color.

One of the first non-driving vertically scrolling games was Atari Football (1978). Scrolling prevents the entire field from having to fit on the screen at once.

Another early concept that leaned on vertical scrolling is skiing. Street Racer (1977), one of the launch titles for the Atari VCS, includes a slalom game in which the gates move down an otherwise empty playfield to give the impression of vertical scrolling. Magnavox published Alpine Skiing! in 1979 for their Odyssey² game console. In 1980, the same year Activision published Bob Whitehead's Skiing for the Atari 2600, Mattel published a different slalom game, also called Skiing, for their Intellivision console. In 1981 Taito published Alpine Ski, an arcade game with three modes of play.

1980's Crazy Climber (Nichibutsu, arcade) has the player scaling a vertically scrolling skyscraper.

Data East's arcade game Flash Boy (1981) for the DECO Cassette System was released in two versions: a side-scrolling version and a vertical scrolling version.

Vertically scrolling shooters 

1979's Galaxian from Namco is a fixed shooter played over a starfield background which gave the impression of vertical movement. The same is true of Ozma Wars from later the same year. The 1981 arcade game Pleiads is a fixed-shooter that vertically scrolls as a transition between stages and then continuously scrolls during a docking sequence.

In 1981, Sega's arcade scrolling shooters Borderline and Space Odyssey, as well as TOSE's arcade shooter Vanguard, have both horizontally and vertically scrolling segments—even diagonal scrolling in the case of the latter. Three purely vertical scrolling shooters were released that year: the ground vehicle based Strategy X (Konami, arcade), Red Clash (Tekhan, arcade), and Atari 8-bit computer game Caverns of Mars. Caverns of Mars follows the visual style and some of the gameplay of the horizontally-scrolling Scramble arcade game released earlier in the year. The Atari 8-bit computers have hardware support for vertical, as well as horizontal, smooth scrolling. Caverns of Mars was cloned for the Apple II as Cavern Creatures (1983). 

In 1982, Namco's Xevious established the template for many vertically scrolling shooters to come: a ship flying over a landscape with both air and ground targets. That same year, Carol Shaw's River Raid was published, a highly rated vertically scrolling shooter for the Atari 2600. The less successful vertical scroller Fantastic Voyage (based on the 1966 film) was also published for the 2600 in 1982. A similar concept was used in Taito's 1983 Bio Attack arcade game.

Xevious-esque vertically scrolling shooters rapidly appeared in the following years: Konami's Mega Zone (1983); Capcom's Vulgus (1984), Exed Exes (1985), Terra Cresta (1985), and TwinBee (1985). Capcom's 1942 (1984) added floating power-ups and end-of-level bosses to the standard formula.

Taito's mostly vertical Front Line (1982) focuses on on-foot combat, where the player can shoot, throw grenades, and climb in and out of tanks while moving deeper into enemy territory. The game seemingly had little influence until three years later when Commando (1985) implemented a similar formula, followed by the even more comparable Ikari Warriors in 1986.

See also
Side-scrolling video game
Parallax scrolling

References

Video game gameplay
Video game genres
Video game graphics